Daniel Mays (born 31 March 1978) is an English actor having had roles in EastEnders (2000), Pearl Harbor,  All or Nothing and Vera Drake (2001), Rehab (2005), Shifty and Red Riding (trilogy) (2008), Made in Dagenham and Ashes to Ashes (2010),  Outcasts (2011), Mrs Biggs and Byzantium (2012), Line of Duty and Rogue One: A Star Wars Story (2016), Des and White Lines (2020). 

Mays has been nominated for best supporting actor at both the BIFA's (2008), and the BAFTA's (2017), as well as having extensive experience in theatre.

Early life
Born in Epping, Essex, the third of four boys, Mays was brought up in Buckhurst Hill, Essex, by his electrician father and bank cashier mother. He attended the Italia Conti Academy of Theatre Arts before going on to become a student at the Royal Academy of Dramatic Art, graduating in 2000 with an Acting (RADA Diploma).

Acting career
In 2000, Mays debut role was a slot in EastEnders. Mays started his big screen career in 2001, as a pilot in the movie Pearl Harbor. His big break happened in 2002, when Mike Leigh cast him in both All or Nothing and Vera Drake, and Mays has said that working with Leigh was a big influence, advising that no stone be unturned when creating truly believable characters.

In 2005, he was cast in the BBC drama Rehab, then in 2008, played the role of Michael Myshkin in Channel 4's adaptation of David Peace's Red Riding trilogy.
His appearance in the 2008 independent British crime film Shifty, co-starring Riz Ahmed, earned him a nomination for best supporting actor at the British Independent Film Awards.

In 2010, Mays starred as Eddie O'Grady in the film Made in Dagenham. In the same year, he played DCI Jim Keats in the third series of Ashes to Ashes, in which he portrayed a character that was the antagonist of Philip Glenister's Gene Hunt.

In 2011, Mays appeared in the BBC sci-fi series Outcasts. He had roles in No One Gets Off in This Town and a supporting role in the Steven Spielberg film The Adventures of Tintin: The Secret of the Unicorn. He then played a criminal on a curfew after serving a 10-year sentence for the murder of his girlfriend when he was 19 in the programme Public Enemies, which aired on BBC One in early January 2012. He played Ronnie Biggs in a 5-part drama called Mrs Biggs. In 2012, he starred alongside Gemma Arterton and Saoirse Ronan in the vampire film Byzantium.

For much of the latter half of 2013, Mays performed on stage. Performing in Nick Payne's Same Deep Water As Me at the Donmar Warehouse alongside Nigel Lindsay and in the first major revival of Jez Butterworth's debut play Mojo at the Harold Pinter Theatre. He starred alongside Ben Whishaw, Brendan Coyle, Rupert Grint and Colin Morgan.

In 2016, Mays starred in Series 3 of BBC drama Line of Duty as Sergeant Danny Waldron, an armed response officer whose troubled and abusive childhood comes under investigation as part of wider investigation of police corruption throughout the serial. He was nominated for a BAFTA Television Award for Supporting Actor for his role. In 2016 Mays played the part of Aston in Harold Pinter's play The Caretaker directed by Matthew Warchus at The Old Vic Theatre in London opposite Timothy Spall and George MacKay. The same year, Mays portrayed Tivik in the film Rogue One: A Star Wars Story.

In 2020, Mays starred as lead investigator Detective Chief Inspector Peter Jay in the ITV three-part television drama miniseries Des, about the 1983 arrest of Scottish serial killer Dennis Nilsen, and as Marcus in the Ibiza based whodunnit series White Lines.

Personal life
Mays has a son and a daughter with makeup artist Louise Burton. As of 2005, he was living in Crouch End, an area in the London Borough of Haringey. A keen football fan, he is a supporter of Leyton Orient.

Filmography

Film

Television

Awards and nominations

References

External links

1978 births
Alumni of the Italia Conti Academy of Theatre Arts
Alumni of RADA
Living people
English male stage actors
English male film actors
English male television actors
Male actors from Essex
20th-century English male actors
21st-century English male actors
People from Epping
People from Buckhurst Hill